Amauris albimaculata, the layman, is a butterfly of the family Nymphalidae. It is found in southern Africa.

The wingspan is 50–60 mm for males and 62–68 for females. Adults are on the wing year-round (with peaks in summer and autumn).

The larvae feed on Tylophora anomala, T. stolzii, Cynanchum chirindense, C. vincetoxicum, Gymnema, Marsdenia (including M. angolensis and M. racemosa) and Secamone.

Subspecies
Amauris albimaculata albimaculata (South Africa, southern Mozambique)
Amauris albimaculata chirindana Talbot, 1941 (western Mozambique, eastern Zimbabwe)
Amauris albimaculata hanningtoni Butler, 1888 (southern Somalia, eastern Kenya, eastern Tanzania)
Amauris albimaculata intermedians Hulstaert, 1926 (Cameroon)
Amauris albimaculata interposita Talbot, 1940 (western Kenya, northern Tanzania)
Amauris albimaculata latifascia Talbot, 1940 (Tanzania, Malawi, northern Zambia)
Amauris albimaculata magnimacula Rebel, 1914 (Uganda, eastern Zaire, north-western Tanzania, Rwanda, Burundi)
Amauris albimaculata sudanica Talbot, 1940 (Sudan, Ethiopia)

References

Seitz, A. Die Gross-Schmetterlinge der Erde 13: Die Afrikanischen Tagfalter. Plate XIII 24 hanningtoni

Amauris
Butterflies described in 1875
Butterflies of Africa
Taxa named by Arthur Gardiner Butler